Melanie Benjamin is chief executive of the Mille Lacs Band of Ojibwe, a sovereign, federally-recognized American Indian tribal government in the Mille Lacs Indian Reservation in east-central Minnesota, USA.

Biography 
Benjamin was originally elected chief executive of the band in 2000, and re-elected in 2004 and 2008. In October 2008, shortly after the start of her third term, she was removed from office following accusations of misappropriation of tribal funds. She was again elected chief executive in 2012 and in 2016. In 2020, Benjamin was again re-elected by the citizens of the Mille Lacs Band of Ojibwe to her sixth consecutive four-year term. In 2018, Benjamin addressed the Band's opioid crisis and provided harsh comments to traditionally Band-supportive groups on their lack of assistance to the Tribe.

References 

Living people
Chief Executives of the Mille Lacs Band of Ojibwe
Ojibwe people
People from Pine County, Minnesota
Native American women in politics
Year of birth missing (living people)
21st-century Native American women
21st-century Native Americans